Vieuvy is a commune in the Mayenne department in north-western France. The name is derived from its 9th-century name Vetus Vico. The commune's original name is derived from the latin words vetus vicus, which means "old-village" in Latin.

See also
Communes of the Mayenne department

References

Communes of Mayenne